Lymphoproliferative response is a specific immune response that entails rapid T-cell replication.  Standard antigens, such as tetanus toxoid, that elicit this response are used in lab tests of immune competence.

References

External links 
 Online Medical Dictionary, lymphoproliferative response

Immune system